Faversham Strike Force Football Club is a football club based in Faversham, England.

History
Faversham Strike Force were founded in 1999 by Gary Axford as a youth football club. In 2012, the club formed a senior team, competing in the Canterbury & District League as Faversham Harlequins. In 2013, back under the Faversham Strike Force guise, the club joined the Kent County League Division Two East, winning promotion in their first season in the league. The following season, the club joined the Division One East, winning the league. In 2015–16, Faversham Strike Force joined the Kent County League Premier Division, winning the league. In 2021, the club was admitted into the Southern Counties East League Division One. Faversham Strike Force entered the FA Vase for the first time in 2021–22.

Ground
In 2020, after six years at Sittingbourne Community College, Faversham Strike Force agreed a groundsharing agreement with Rochester United to play at the  Rochester United Sports Ground, Strood.

References

Faversham
Association football clubs established in 1999
1999 establishments in England
Football clubs in England
Football clubs in Kent
Kent County League
Southern Counties East Football League